Kaisma is a village in Põhja-Pärnumaa Parish, Pärnu County, Estonia. Kaisma has conglutinated with the neighbouring Kergu village. The nearest railway stations are in Kõnnu and Viluvere.

As of the 2011 Census, the settlement's population was 116.

Kaisma was first mentioned as Caysma in 1530. Kaisma Manor had existed already in 1601. The main building and distillery were destroyed during the Revolution of 1905. Geologist and botanist Carl Friedrich Schmidt (1832–1908) was born in the manor.

Between 1991–2009, Kaisma was the administrative centre of Kaisma Parish, before it was merged into Vändra Parish. In 2017, Vändra Parish was merged into newly established Põhja-Pärnumaa Parish.

Gallery

References

Villages in Pärnu County
Kreis Pernau